Roberto Hilbo Giovani Purini (21 March 1937 – 3 February 2023) was a Brazilian lawyer and politician. A member of the Brazilian Democratic Movement, he served in the Legislative Assembly of São Paulo from 1979 to 1999.

Purini died in Bauru on 3 February 2023, at the age of 85.

References

1937 births
2023 deaths
Brazilian Democratic Movement politicians
Members of the Legislative Assembly of São Paulo
20th-century Brazilian politicians